Dynomutt, Dog Wonder is an American animated television series produced by Hanna-Barbera Productions that aired on ABC from 1976 to 1977. The show centers on a Batman-esque superhero, the Blue Falcon, and his assistant, Dynomutt, a bumbling, yet effective robotic dog who can produce a seemingly infinite number of mechanical devices from his body. As with many other animated superheroes of the era, no origins for the characters are ever provided.

Dynomutt was originally broadcast as a half-hour segment of The Scooby-Doo/Dynomutt Hour (1976–77), and a quarter-hour segment of its later expanded form Scooby's All-Star Laff-A-Lympics (1977–78); it would later be rerun and syndicated on its own from 1978 on. The cast of The Scooby-Doo Show appeared as recurring characters on Dynomutt, assisting the Daring Duo in cracking their crimes. Originally distributed by Hanna-Barbera's then-parent company Taft Broadcasting, Warner Bros. Television currently holds the distribution rights to the series.

Overview
Millionaire socialite art dealer Radley Crown (voiced by Gary Owens) and his mechanical dog Dynomutt (voiced by Frank Welker, who got the inspiration for the voice from the Gertrude and Heathcliff characters of Red Skelton) enjoy leisure time in their base of operations in Big City, until alerted by the Falcon Flash. They then immediately dash to the Falcon's Lair (situated in Crown's penthouse), where they switch to their secret identities, the Blue Falcon and Dynomutt, Dog Wonder, respectively. The Blue Falcon and Dynomutt receive the report via TV screen from the secret GHQ of secret agent F.O.C.U.S. One (voiced by Ron Feinberg), jump into the Falconcar and speed into the fray against assorted evildoers.

In a coup similar to the 1960s Batman TV series, the first 10 minutes of Dynomutt ends with a cliffhanger wherein the Daring Duo, in the clutches of their foes, are subjected to a perilous fate which is resolved immediately after the commercial. Like many animated series created by Hanna-Barbera in the 1970s, the show contains a laugh track created by the studio.

The metallic mutt employs a system of miniaturized transistors which allow him to extend his limbs or neck and use them to perform extraordinary feats; however, none of them ever work properly. "B.F." (as Dynomutt lovingly refers to him) is more Dynomutt's victim than his master, forever being hamstrung by the latter's insufferably clumsy mechanized mishaps, which often results in the Blue Falcon calling Dynomutt "Dog Blunder". Nevertheless, Dynomutt and the Blue Falcon, who is equipped with his own arsenal of supergadgetry, manage to get the situation well in hand.

Episode guide

The Scooby-Doo/Dynomutt Hour (1976)
The episode titles given reflect Hanna-Barbera studio records. No on-screen titles were given for this series.

 1 These episodes guest-star Scooby-Doo and the Mystery, Inc. gang.
 2 Episode 1.12, "There's a Demon Shark in the Foggy Dark/The Awful Ordeal with the Head of Steel", was originally broadcast not on a Saturday morning, but on Thanksgiving Day 1976 (November 25), during ABC's Thanksgiving Funshine Festival.
 3 These episodes, and all first-season repeats, were broadcast as part of The Scooby-Doo/Dynomutt Show, which included an additional half-hour featuring a Scooby-Doo, Where Are You! rerun.

The Blue Falcon & Dynomutt (1977)

These four new episodes were also aired under the new title The Blue Falcon & Dynomutt. All in all, Dynomutt, Dog Wonder lasted 20 episodes in total, four episodes more than Jabberjaw.

Voice cast
 Frank Welker – Dynomutt, Fred Jones (in "Everyone Hyde," "What Now, Lowbrow," "The Wizard of Ooze"), Bugsy Busby (in "The Day and Nightcrawler")
 Gary Owens – the Blue Falcon
 Ron Feinberg – F.O.C.U.S. One, the Narrator, Mudmouth (in "The Wizard of Ooze"), the Worm (in "The Day and Night Crawler," "The Injustice League of America")
 Larry McCormick as the Mayor of Big City

Additional voices
 Henry Corden – Mr. Hyde/Willie the Weasel (in "Everyone Hyde"), the Prophet (in "The Prophet Profits")
 Regis Cordic 
 Joan Gerber 
 Bob Holt - Manyfaces (in "Sinister Symphony")
 Ralph James 
 Casey Kasem – Norville "Shaggy" Rogers (in "Everyone Hyde," "What Now, Lowbrow," "The Wizard of Ooze"), Fishface (in "The Harbor Raider"), the Swamp Rat (in "The Wizard of Ooze"), Lowbrow's Henchman (in "What Now, Lowbrow"), Professor Orville (in "Everyone Hyde")
 Julie McWhirter – the Queen Hornet (in "The Queen Hornet," "The Injustice League of America")
 Allan Melvin – Superthug (second time), Grub (in "The Day and Nightcrawler")
 Don Messick – Scooby-Doo, Mumbly (in "The Great Brain...Train Robbery"), the Gimmick (in "The Injustice League of America"), Lowbrow (in "What Now, Lowbrow," "The Injustice League of America"), Lowbrow's Henchman (in "What Now, Lowbrow"), the Gimmick's Henchmen (in "The Great Brain...Train Robbery"), Jeweler (in "Everyone Hyde")
 Heather North – Daphne Blake (in "Everyone Hyde," "What Now, Lowbrow," "The Wizard of Ooze")
 John Stephenson – Chief Grisby, Chief Wiggins (in "The Great Brain...Train Robbery"), the Blimp (in "Lighter Than Air Raid"), Eric von Flick (in "Tin Kong"), Shadowman/Herman Twitch (in "Shadowman"), the Red Vulture (in "The Blue Falcon vs. the Red Vulture"), the Glob's Henchmen (in "The Glob"), Fishface's Henchmen, the Gimmick's Henchmen (in "The Great Brain...Train Robbery"), Manyfaces' Henchmen (in "Sinister Symphony")
 Pat Stevens – Velma Dinkley (in "Everyone Hyde," "What Now, Lowbrow," "The Wizard of Ooze")
 Lennie Weinrib – Superthug (first time), Roto-Chopper (in "The Day and Nightcrawler"), the Gimmick's Henchmen (in "The Great Brain...Train Robbery")

Broadcast history

Dynomutt, Dog Wonder originally aired in these following formats on ABC and NBC:
 The Scooby-Doo/Dynomutt Hour (September 11, 1976 – November 27, 1976, ABC)
 The Scooby-Doo/Dynomutt Show (December 4, 1976 – September 3, 1977, ABC)
 Scooby's All-Star Laff-A-Lympics (as The Blue Falcon & Dynomutt) (September 10, 1977 – March 11, 1978, ABC)
 Dynomutt, Dog Wonder (June 3, 1978 – September 2, 1978, ABC) (rerun)
 The Godzilla/Dynomutt Hour (September 27, 1980 – November 15, 1980, NBC) (rerun)

Dynomutt also aired on USA Cartoon Express during the 1980s.

Between January 2 and March 9, 2008, repeats of Dynomutt, Dog Wonder were shown on Boomerang. On June 4, 2009, Dynomutt, Dog Wonder returned to Boomerang and aired Thursdays through Sundays at 10am Eastern. But the show stopped airing on Boomerang due to the re-branding that happened on January 19, 2015, that also removed many other older shows.

Home media
All 16 episodes of the first season were released in the DVD set The Scooby-Doo/Dynomutt Hour: The Complete Series from Warner Home Video.

In other media
 Gary Owens and Frank Welker reprise their roles of the Blue Falcon and Dynomutt in guest appearances in the Dexter's Laboratory episode "Dyno-Might". The Blue Falcon comes to Dexter when Dynomutt is heavily damaged during their fight with the supervillain, Buzzord (voiced by Rob Paulsen). Though Dexter obliges, Dynomutt destroys his laboratory, leading to Dexter deactivating Dynomutt and creating Dynomutt X-90 (also voiced by Welker), who becomes a fanatical vigilante using excessive and lethal force to deal with minor crimes such as parking violations, jaywalking, and littering. Dexter tries to help the Blue Falcon stop Dynomutt X-90, but after being cornered, Dexter reveals he built Dynomutt X-90 because he deemed the original a goofy idiot sidekick. The Blue Falcon states Dynomutt was not just a goofy idiot sidekick, he was a go-go dog person. He then reactivates the original Dynomutt, who arrives and distracts Dynomutt X-90 enough for Dexter to deactivate him.
 Dynomutt's picture made a cameo in an episode of the 2 Stupid Dogs segment, Super Secret Secret Squirrel.
 Owens reprises his role as the Blue Falcon in the Johnny Bravo episode "Johnny Makeover" wherein he, "Weird Al" Yankovic and Don Knotts redesign Johnny's show in a parody of Queer Eye for the Straight Guy.
 The Blue Falcon appears as a recurring character in the Harvey Birdman, Attorney at Law TV series and once in the video game of the same title as a Spanish lawyer named Antonio de Rivera Garcia Azul Falcón (voiced by Maurice LaMarche). A similarly Spanish-accented Dynomutt also appeared in the two-part episode "Deadomutt", voiced by André Sogliuzzo.
 Dynomutt and the Blue Falcon appeared in the Robot Chicken episode "Ban on the Fun", voiced by Victor Yerrid and Kevin Shinick.
 Dynomutt and the Blue Falcon appeared in the Scooby-Doo! Mystery Incorporated episode "Heart of Evil", with Welker reprising his role of Dynomutt, while the Blue Falcon was voiced by Troy Baker. This series depicts an origin where Radley and his dog Reggie were security guards at Quest Labs. After a robot dragon attacks and injures Reggie's organic body, Dr. Benton Quest rebuilds him as a cyborg dog. While Dynomutt retains his personality from the original series, the Blue Falcon is depicted as a gritty and violent vigilante reminiscent of Batman in Frank Miller's The Dark Knight Returns.
 Dynomutt and the Blue Falcon appear in the Scooby-Doo crossover direct-to-DVD movie, Scooby-Doo! Mask of the Blue Falcon, with Welker reprising his role of Dynomutt once more. The duo was redesigned to be a film-within-a-film with two different iterations of the Blue Falcon. Owen Garrison (voiced by Jeff Bennett) was the star of the original TV series, who became embittered by Hollywood for rebooting his show as a dark and gritty movie with actor Brad Adams (voiced by Diedrich Bader) in the lead role as a technology-based Blue Falcon while Dynomutt was reworked into a destructive robot dog. The film's main antagonist, Jack Rabble, used the identity of the Blue Falcon's arch-enemy, Mr. Hyde, to commit a daring heist and frame Garrison for it. However, he was foiled by Garrison and Scooby-Doo.
 Dynomutt and Blue Falcon appear in the Scooby-Doo and Guess Who? episode "Scooby-Doo, Dog Wonder!", with Blue Falcon voiced by David Kaye impersonating Gary Owens while Frank Welker once again reprising his role as Dynomutt. Velma Dinkley is shown to be a fan of Blue Falcon.
 Dynomutt and Blue Falcon appeared in the Jellystone! episode "Heroes and Capes" with Blue Falcon voiced by Rob Riggle. Blue Falcon pretends to be buff due to inflations in his superhero outfit. Dynomutt does not talk.

Hanna-Barbera Cinematic Universe
The Blue Falcon and Dynomutt appeared in the animated Scooby-Doo film Scoob!, with the Blue Falcon voiced by Mark Wahlberg and Dynomutt voiced by Ken Jeong. They were also joined by assistant Dee Dee Skyes and butler Keith. During the movie's credits, it's revealed that the Blue Falcon founded the Falcon Force alongside Atom Ant, Captain Caveman, Jabberjaw, and Grape Ape.

In the movie we learn that Radley, the original Blue Falcon, has retired to Palm Beach, Florida, and his son, Brian, has taken up the mantle of the Blue Falcon.  But Brian is struggling in the role.  Dynomutt is portrayed in the film as being more mature and far more competent than in the early cartoons, but he is also disdainful of Brian, and mocks him frequently.  Over time, however, Dynomutt's attitude toward Brian improves, and by the end of the film he's providing Brian with the encouragement that he needs in order to step out of his father's shadow. 

Dynomutt and Blue Falcon's iterations from the Scoob! film also made cameo appearances in Space Jam: A New Legacy. They are seen as spectators watching the basketball game between the Tune Squad and the Goon Squad.

Comics
 From November 1977 to September 1978, Marvel Comics published a bimonthly Dynomutt comic book series that lasted for six issues.
 Ongoing series Cartoon Network Presents #21 (May 1999) featured a story starring Dynomutt and the Blue Falcon. It was written by Dan Slott with art by Many Galan and Mike DeCarlo.
 As part of a series of crossovers featuring DC and Hanna-Barbera characters together, DC launched Super-Sons/Dynomutt Special #1 in May 2018. The issue was written by Peter Tomasi with art by Fernando Pasarin.

See also
 List of works produced by Hanna-Barbera Productions

References

External links
 
 THE FALCON'S LAIR: The Unofficial Guide to Dynomutt Dog Wonder
 InternationalHero: Dynomutt
 Cartoon Network: Dept. of Cartoons: Dynomutt – cached copy from Internet Archives
 The Cartoon Scrapbook – Information and details on Dynomutt, Dog Wonder.

1970s American animated television series
1976 American television series debuts
1977 American television series endings
American animated television spin-offs
American Broadcasting Company original programming
American children's animated action television series
American children's animated adventure television series
American children's animated comic science fiction television series
American children's animated superhero television series
Animated television series about dogs
Animated television series about robots
Dog superheroes
English-language television shows
Fictional robotic dogs
Scooby-Doo characters
Hanna-Barbera characters
Hanna-Barbera superheroes
DC Comics superheroes
Robot superheroes
Television shows adapted into comics
Television series by Hanna-Barbera
Television series created by Joe Ruby
Television series created by Ken Spears
Television sidekicks
science fiction franchises
Comedy franchises
Male characters in animation
Male characters in animated films
male characters in animated series